Robert Indiana (born Robert Clark; September 13, 1928 – May 19, 2018) was an American artist associated with the pop art movement.

His iconic image LOVE was first created in 1964 in the form of a card which he sent to several friends and acquaintances in the art world. In 1965, Robert Indiana was invited to propose an artwork to be featured on the Museum of Modern Art's annual Christmas card. Indiana submitted several 12” square oil on canvas variations based on his LOVE image. The museum selected the most intense color combination in red, blue, and green. It became one of the most popular cards the museum has ever offered. Indiana continued to develop his LOVE series, and in 1966, worked with Marian Goodman of Multiples, Inc. to make his first LOVE sculpture in aluminum. In 1970, Indiana completed his first monumental LOVE sculpture in Cor-Ten steel which is in the collection of the Indianapolis Museum of Art.

In addition to being a painter and sculptor, Indiana made posters and prints and also designed stage sets and costumes for the Virgil Thompson and Gertrude Stein opera The Mother of Us All. Indiana's artwork has been featured in numerous exhibitions around the world and is included in the permanent collections of many major museums including the Museum of Modern Art, New York; Tate Modern, London; and the San Francisco Museum of Modern Art.

Biography
Robert Indiana was born Robert Clark in New Castle, Indiana, and was adopted as an infant by Earl Clark and Carmen Watters. After his parents divorced, he relocated to Indianapolis to live with his father so he could attend Arsenal Technical High School (1942–1946), from which he graduated as valedictorian of his class.

After serving for three years in the United States Army Air Forces, Indiana studied at the Art Institute of Chicago (1949–1953), the Skowhegan School of Painting and Sculpture in Maine (summer 1953) and Edinburgh University and Edinburgh College of Art (1953–1954). He returned to the United States in 1954 and settled in New York City.

In New York, Indiana's partner Ellsworth Kelly, whom he met in 1956, helped him find a loft on Coenties Slip. On Coenties Slip he met neighboring artists like Jack Youngerman, Agnes Martin and Cy Twombly, with whom he shared his studio for a time. In 1958 he changed his name to Indiana.

Indiana's career took off in the early 1960s after Alfred H. Barr, Jr., bought The American Dream, I for the Museum of Modern Art.

In 1964, Indiana moved from Coenties Slip to a five-story building at Spring Street and the Bowery. In the summer of 1969, he visited Life magazine photographer Elliot Elisofon on the Island of Vinalhaven and began renting the upstairs of the 100 year old Victorian-style Odd Fellows Hall named "The Star of Hope" in the island town of Vinalhaven, Maine. Indiana was drawn to the Odd Fellows insignia which consists of three interlocking links. “The three links of course are truth and friendship, and the important link in the middle just happens to be love.  So I think I was fated to end my life in an Odd Fellows Lodge” — Robert IndianaHalf a century earlier, Marsden Hartley had made his escape to the same island. Indiana discovered a great affinity to Marsden Hartley to whom he pays homage in a series of work in the late 1980s. When Elisofon died in 1973, Indiana bought the lodge for $10,000 from his estate. He moved in full-time when he lost his lease on the Bowery in 1978.

Indiana grew reclusive in his final years. He died on May 19, 2018, at his home in Vinalhaven, Maine, of respiratory failure at the age of 89. One day before his death, a lawsuit was filed over claims that his caretaker had isolated him from family and friends, and was marketing unauthorized reproductions of his works.

Work
Indiana’s complex and multilayered work explores the power of language, American identity, and personal history, and often consists of striking, simple and direct words. Drawing on the vocabulary of vernacular highway signs and roadside entertainments, Indiana created a body of work that appears bold and energetic. His best known examples include short words like EAT, DIE, HUG, ERR, and LOVE.

In his EAT series, the word blares in paint or light bulbs against a neutral background. In a major career milestone, the architect Philip Johnson commissioned an EAT sign for the New York State Pavilion at the 1964 New York World's Fair. The sign was turned off one day after the opening of the fair because visitors believed it to mark a restaurant. Andy Warhol's contribution to the fair was also removed that day.

Indiana’s series of monumental sculptures can be seen across the globe, including LOVE, Imperial LOVE, LOVE Wall, AHAVA, AMOR, and ONE Through ZERO (The Ten Numbers).  Indiana’s own hard-edged painterly aesthetic paved the way for the later sculptural editions which would translate this into three dimensions. In the aftermath of the September 11, 2001, attacks, Indiana created his series of Peace Paintings which were exhibited at the Paul Kasmin Gallery in New York in 2004.

Between 1989 and 1994, Indiana painted a series of 18 canvases inspired by the shapes and numbers in the War Motif paintings that Marsden Hartley did in Berlin between 1913 and 1915.

Indiana was also a theatrical set and costume designer; he designed Santa Fe Opera's 1976 production of Virgil Thomson's The Mother of Us All, based on the life of suffragist Susan B. Anthony. He was the star of Andy Warhol's film Eat (1964), which is a 45-minute film of Indiana eating a mushroom. Warhol also made the brief silent film Bob Indiana Etc. (4 minutes, 1963), a portrait of the artist with appearances by Wynn Chamberlain and John Giorno.

Indiana's series of monumental sculptures of the digits zero through to nine, ONE Through ZERO (The Ten Numbers) has been displayed in several cities since its 1980 creation.

LOVE

Indiana's best known image is the word love in upper-case letters, arranged in a square with its trademarked tilted letter "O". The iconography first appeared in a series of poems originally written in 1958, in which Indiana stacked LO and VE on top of one another. The first paintings addressing the subject of love were 4-Star Love (1961) and Love Is God (1964).

The art historian Susan Elizabeth Ryan wrote that in 1964 LOVE had been a "more explicit four-letter word — beginning with F, and with a second letter, a U, intriguingly tilted to the right." Indiana and Kelly had been in a rocky relationship and Indiana had been working on word paintings. She adds "The two men were in the habit of exchanging postcard-size sketches, with Mr. Kelly laying down fields of color and Mr. Indiana adding large words atop the abstractions."

Indiana’s red, blue, and green LOVE painting was then selected to appear on the Museum of Modern Art’s annual Christmas card in 1965. In an interview Robert Indiana said "It was the most profitable Christmas card the museum ever published."

Indiana said he was inspired to use these colors because his father used to work at a Phillips 66 gas station whose colors were green and red. Robert Indiana described the original colors as "the red and green of that sign against the blue Hoosier sky". Still it is believed the colors were inspired also by the painting Red Blue Green (1963) of Ellsworth Kelly, his former partner.

Indiana said, "Ellsworth Kelly introduced me to Hard-Edge and was a great influence on my work, and is responsible for my being here".

The first serigraph/silk screen of LOVE was printed as part of an exhibition poster for Stable Gallery in 1966 on the occasion of Indiana’s show dedicated to his LOVE series .

In 1973, the United States Postal Service commissioned a stamp design by Indiana and released the eight-cent LOVE stamp in advance of Valentine’s Day. Unveiled in a ceremony at the Philadelphia Museum of Art, the stamp became so popular that 425 million were printed over the next two years.

Hebrew version
In 1977, he created a Hebrew LOVE with the four-letter word Ahava (אהבה "love" in Hebrew) using Cor-Ten steel, for the Israel Museum Art Garden in Jerusalem.

Variation for Google
For Valentine's Day 2011, Google paid homage to Indiana’s LOVE, which was displayed in place of the search engine site's normal logo.

Exhibitions
In 1962, Eleanor Ward's Stable Gallery hosted Robert Indiana's first New York solo exhibition. Indiana’s work has been represented by Paul Kasmin Gallery in New York City, Waddington Custot in London and Galerie Gmurzynska in Europe.

From July 4 – September 14, 2008, Indiana's work was the subject of the grand multiple-location exhibition Robert Indiana a Milano; the main exhibition took place at the Padiglione d’Arte Contemporanea (Pavilion of Contemporary Art), and other works were displayed in public piazzas in Milan.

In 2013, the Whitney Museum of American Art mounted a retrospective of his work entitled Robert Indiana: Beyond LOVE, this exhibition traveled to the McNay Art Museum in San Antonio, Texas.

The first retrospective of Indiana’s sculptures in the United Kingdom, spanning 60 years of the artist’s career, opened Yorkshire Sculpture Park on March 12, 2022 and runs through January 2023.

Appearances of his work in popular culture
Millions of television viewers saw an orange, brown, and white version of Five, one of Indiana's 1965 Numbers series, featured in an episode of The Mary Tyler Moore Show during the 1971–1972 season, in which Rhoda Morgenstern redecorates Lou Grant's dated living room.  Lou, evidently not a fan of pop art, complains to Mary, "I bet she went through four other paintings before choosing this one!"

In 2014, ESPN released MECCA: The Floor That Made Milwaukee Famous, a short film in its 30 for 30 series of sports documentaries. It chronicles how Indiana's floor at the MECCA was saved from being sold for scrap.

Collections
Today, Indiana's artworks are featured in the collections of numerous museums globally, including Museum of Modern Art, New York; Whitney Museum of American Art, New York; Metropolitan Museum of Art, New York; National Gallery of Art, Washington D.C.; Hirshhorn Museum and Sculpture Garden, Washington, D.C.; Smithsonian Museum of American Art, Washington, D.C. Farnsworth Art Museum, Rockland, Maine; Stedelijk Museum, Amsterdam, the Netherlands; McNay Art Museum, San Antonio, Texas; Carnegie Institute, Pittsburgh; Allentown Art Museum of the Lehigh Valley, Allentown, Pennsylvania; Williams College Museum of Art or WCMA, in Williamstown, Massachusetts; Delaware Art Museum, Wilmington; Detroit Institute of Art, Michigan; Baltimore Museum of Art, Maryland; Brandeis Museum, Waltham, Massachusetts; Walker Art Center, Minneapolis; Albright-Knox Gallery, Buffalo, New York; San Francisco Museum of Modern Art, California; the Indianapolis Museum of Art, Indiana; and the Los Angeles County Museum of Art, California; Menil Collection, Houston; Tate Modern, London; Museum Ludwig, Cologne, Germany; Van Abbemuseum, Eindhoven, the Netherlands; Nationalgalerie, Berlin; MUMOK (Museum Moderner Kunst Stiftung Ludwig Wien), Vienna; Art Museum of Ontario, Toronto; and Israel Museum, Jerusalem. among many others.

Art market
In May 2011, a 12-foot LOVE sculpture – one in an edition of three identical pieces – sold for $4.1 million.

References

Further reading
 Peter Plagens (February 10, 2013). 'Robert Indiana: Beyond Love' at the Whitney Museum. The Wall Street Journal.
 Ken Johnson (September 26, 2013). Robert Indiana and 'Beyond Love' at the Whitney. The New York Times.
 Dan Duray (September 18, 2013). On the Horn With a Hoosier, A Fun Little Telephone Q&A With Robert Indiana. Gallerist.

External links

RobertIndiana.com

Smithsonian Museum of American Art
Robert Indiana Sculptures on Google Maps
Robert Indiana, Decade Autoportrait, exhibition, 17 September - 26 October 2013, de Sarthe Gallery, Hong Kong
'It wasn't all he needed, or all he did: Robert Indiana and "Beyond Love" at the Whitney' New York Times, 10/09/2013

1928 births
2018 deaths
American pop artists
20th-century American painters
American male painters
Artists from Indianapolis
American LGBT artists
Modern painters
People from New Castle, Indiana
People from Vinalhaven, Maine
American stamp designers
Alumni of the University of Edinburgh
Alumni of the Edinburgh College of Art
20th-century American sculptors
20th-century American male artists
American male sculptors
20th-century American printmakers
Painters from Indiana
Sculptors from Indiana
LGBT people from Indiana
Skowhegan School of Painting and Sculpture alumni